Marmara Island is a Turkish island in the Sea of Marmara. With an area of  it is the largest island in the Sea of Marmara and is the second largest island of Turkey after Gökçeada (older name in Turkish: ;  Imvros). It is the center of Marmara district in Balıkesir Province. Transportation is possible from Istanbul by ship and ferry, and by motorboat from Tekirdağ and Erdek. Marmara island is full of historical treasures which increase its attractiveness. The town of  "Mermer Plaj"/Marble Beach takes its name from the marble for which the town is famous and which gives the island and the sea their name.

Etymology

In ancient times the island was called Proikonesos or Prokonnesos, Latinized as Proconnesus. Under the name Proconnesus it is a titular see of the Roman Catholic Church (the see has been vacant since the death in 1963 of the most recent occupant), and of the Ecumenical Patriarchate of Constantinople.

Proconnesian marble is used extensively in the Hagia Sophia in Constantinople, and exclusively in the Herculean Sarcophagus of Genzano now in the British Museum. Additionally, it was used in the Basilica of Maxentius and the arch of Septime Severe in the Roman Forum (Marble is still the island's primary export).

History
Historical evidence of the first Hellenic presence on the island of Marmara (ancient Prokonnessos) came with the early colonization of Ionian Greeks in the 8th century BC.   Stories and legends identify the island as a visiting place of Jason and the Argonauts and with the Hellenic expedition against Troy. In 493 BC it was burned by a Phoenician fleet fighting for Darius the Great. The island was ruled for the Achaemenid Empire under a Greek tyrant named Metrodorus.

In 410 BC, Alcibiades conquered it for Athens.

During the Diocletianic Persecution, the Emperor Diocletian ordered low-status Manichaeans to be executed while high-status Manichaeans were to be sent to work in the quarries of Proconnesus or the mines of Khirbat Faynan.
 
During the reign of Constantine the Great in the 4th century, notable aristocracy from Constantinople first settled on the island. By 569, many Byzantine aristocrats had built palaces on the island that they had accepted as their home. The greatest palace of this period was built by the Emperor Justinian I. With the Emperor came a large entourage of nobility, palace guards, tradesmen, and servants. Justinian also built a large convent on Marmara that is one of the earliest in recorded history. The Byzantine royal presence on the island was strongly felt through strong ties to the Patriarchate of Constantinople. During most of its history, the island was called "Proikonnesos" (island of the royal dowry), and "Prinkipo", (island of the aristocracy). 
 
From the fall of the Byzantine Empire through the beginning of the Ottoman period, the island was almost exclusively populated by  Greek Orthodox Christians. The island was a refuge for the runaways of the Devshirme System. For example in 1567, a group of runaways was protected and hidden by the locals of Marmara Island while the batches of children were being transported from the port of Dutlimanı in Bandırma. Beginning in the 17th century some Turks and a relatively large number of Jewish people lived on the island; most of these were Sephardi who had left Spain after the Inquisition. During World War I much of the population was forced off the island onto the mainland. And, following the war, as a result of the 1923 Treaty of Lausanne and the population exchange between Greece and Turkey, all remaining Greeks native to the island of Marmara emigrated to Greece and other locations around the globe.

The island's Greek Orthodox diaspora settled primarily in Neos Marmaras in Chalkidiki, the island of Euboea and in the city of Thessaloniki in northern Greece. In addition, Canada, Australia and South America were popular destinations for Greek immigration of that time.  Many of the former Jewish residents settled in the North American cities of New York, Los Angeles, San Francisco, Portland (Oregon) and the Seattle/Tacoma area.

Many of the current residents of Marmara Adasi are descendants of Turks who fled Greek islands during the population transfers of the 1920s and Circassians (Çerkesler) originally from the Russian Caucasus.

1935 earthquake
On 4 January 1935 at 16:41:29 local time, an earthquake hit the Marmara Island and its neighboring islands Avşa and Paşalimanı, causing five deaths, 30 people injured and several villages destroyed.

Administration center and the villages
Marmara Island has five villages and one central town. The center is called Marmara and is the administration center of two more islands (Avşa and Ekinlik Islands) nearby. The population was mainly Greek along with some Turkish and Jewish population in Marmara settlement until the population exchange between Greece and Turkey in 1923. Today the local people are originally from different regions of Turkey and Balkans, mainly from Middle and East of Black Sea Region and Western Thrace of Greece. The permanent population, distances from the center, the current names and the previous names of the villages are: 
Marmara (Greek; Marmara and Proconnesus); 2183
Çinarli (Greek; Galemi); 503, 7 Km
Gündoğdu (Greek; Prastos); 278, 4 Km
Topağaç (Greek; Kılazaki); 518, 12 Km
Asmalı (Greek; Aftoni); 237, 18 Km
Saraylar (Greek; Palatia); 2687, 24 Km

Panoramic view

See also
 SS Kurtuluş, a cargo ship sank off the island in 1942 carrying food aid to Greece.

References

Further reading
 Papers presented to the II. National Symposium on the Aegean Islands, 2–3 July 2004, Gökçeada, Çanakkale

Ancient Greek geography
Islands of the Sea of Marmara
Islands of Turkey
Populated places in Balıkesir Province
Proconnesus
Fishing communities in Turkey
Islands of Balıkesir Province
Catholic titular sees in Asia
Members of the Delian League